Vitandus and toleratus are former categories of excommunicates from the Catholic Church.

A vitandus (Latin for "(one) to be avoided"; plural: vitandi) is someone affected by a rare and grave form of excommunication, in which the Catholic Church ordered, as a remedial measure, that the faithful were not to associate with an excommunicated individual in any way "except in the case of husband and wife, parents, children, servants, subjects", and in general unless there was some reasonable excusing cause.

A toleratus (Latin for "tolerated"; plural: tolerati) is someone excommunicated but that law does not obliges the faithful to abstain from intercourse with, even in religious matters.

Origin 
The distinction between a vitandus ("to be avoided") and a toleratus ("tolerated") excommunicate was introduced by Pope Martin V in 1418 in his apostolic constitution Ad evitanda scandala.

Characteristics 
Public excommunication in foro externo had two degrees according as it has or has not been formally published, or, in other words, according as excommunicated persons are to be shunned (vitandi) or tolerated (tolerati).

 Vitandi: excommunicates under a formally published or nominative excommunication which asks the faithful to shun the excommunicate.
The three criteria to be a vitantus were: 1) the decree of excommunication must publicly announced (such as by publication in the Acta Apostolicae Sedis), 2) the excommunicate's name must be mentoned in the decree, 3) the decree must expressly state the person is to be considered a vitandus (i.e., that the person is to be shunned, avoided).

The formally published or nominative excommunications occur when the sentence has been brought to the knowledge of the public by a notification from the judge, indicating by name the person thus punished. No special method is required for this publication; according to the Council of Constance, it suffices that "the sentence have been published or made known by the judge in a special and express manner". Persons thus excommunicated are to be shunned (vitandi), i.e. the faithful must have no intercourse with them either in regard to sacred things or (to a certain extent) profane matters.

Salaverri and Nicolau state: "An excommunicated person is one who must be avoided (vitandus) who by name has been excluded from the communion of the faithful by the Apostolic See, and either by the law itself or by a public decree or sentence by name has been denounced as someone who must be avoided".

 Tolerati: all other excommunicated persons, even though known, are tolerati, i.e. the law does not obliges the faithful to abstain from intercourse with those excommunicates, even in religious matters.

History 
The 1917 Code included this distinction. It imposed automatically (as a latae sententiae) the status of vitandus to anyone who committed physical violence on the Pope himself, and states that with that exception "nobody is a vitandus excommunicate unless the Apostolic See has excommunicated him by name and has proclaimed the excommunication publicly and in the decree has stated expressly that he must be avoided".

In 1908 Alfred Loisy, Ernesto Buonaiuti, Joseph Turmel, and other Modernists were declared vitandi. In 1930, there were only five living who received the status of vitandus. Leonard Feeney's 1953 excommunication included only two out of the three conditions (the decree did not state Feeney was to be considered vitandus); therefore he was not vitandus.

This distinction between vitandus and toleratus "was still found in canon law as late as the early 20th century, but it has been dropped from current law as being unworkable given the way modern societies are set up".

Consequences 

According to the 1917 code (canon 809), public masses could not be held for either vitandi or tolerati. "Private Masses could be applied for tolerated excommunicates (excommunicati tolerati), which included baptized non-Catholics, but for the excommunicates who must be avoided (excommunicati vitandi), a private Mass could be applied only for their conversion (CIC [1917, canon] 2262, §2, 2°). A 'private Mass' excluded any publicizing of the name of the person for whom the Mass was being applied".

Catholic theologian Ludwig Ott considers that those who had been excommunicated as vitandi were not part of the Catholic Church (contrarily to what some like Hermannus Dieckmann and Francisco Suárez state). Ott adds that those excommunicated tolerati "according to the opinion almost generally held today" were still members of the Catholic Church "even after the promulgation of the juridical judgment and even if they are deprived of many spiritual benefits".

See also 

 Shunning#In religion
 Herem (censure)

References

Catholic penal canon law
Excommunication
Catholic Church legal terminology
Shunning